Oralgaisha Omarshanova (Oralğaişa Omarşanova) (1968 – went missing 30 March 2007) was a Kazakh journalist. She worked for the paper Zakon i Pravosudiye ("Law And Justice"), based in Astana. On 30 March she had secured a trip to Almaty Province to cover the clashes between Kazakhs and ethnic Chechens in the villages of Malovodnoye and Kazatkom, but never arrived. She had told a colleague previously that she had received threats by phone. She was last seen getting into a jeep in Almaty.

Background
On 28 February and 7 March 2007, Omarshanova wrote two articles outlining her theories on whether the murder of Sagit Shokputov, an influential Jezkazgan-based businessman and manager of Kazakhmys, had any connection with his vilification by the state-controlled media shortly before his death.

According to the Kazakh government, on 17 March 2007, a mob of hundreds of Kazakhs in Malovodnoye and Kazatkom surrounded the Chechen Makmakhanov family at their home, demanding explanation for a quarrel the previous night in which one of the brothers shot a Kazakh in the leg. The brothers shot back from their windows, wounding nine Kazakhs and killing two. The mob then attacked and set fire to the structure, killing three members of the family. Most media coverage focused on the ethnic nature of the conflict.

As she had been covering the Shokputov story, Omarshanova was interested in the event as one of the Makmakhanov brothers—Vitta—had been charged for a businessman's murder, and was officially being held in Jezkazgan. Instead he was at home at the time, and not a victim of the killings, unlike his three brothers. She was also interested in the lack of a police response, as the event took hours to transpire.

Events before disappearance
Omarshanova planned to investigate whether there was a connection. She claimed that Vitta was not the real murderer, and reported that another brother, Amir, had ties with Kazakhmys. The eldest brother, Khadzhimurat, was on the Kazakhstan Board of Judges; Shamil was in the oil business; and Nadhzmitdin worked for the Almaty Prosecutor's Office.

In April 2009 the Kazakhstan Interior Ministry detained Serik Zhamanaev, who they claimed to be a known criminal, for her murder.

See also
List of people who disappeared

References

1968 births
2000s missing person cases
Assassinated Kazakhstani journalists
Enforced disappearances
Kazakhstani women journalists
Missing person cases in Kazakhstan
Year of death missing
History of women in Kazakhstan